Ian Murray may refer to:
Ian Murray (bishop) (1932–2016), Scottish Roman Catholic bishop
Ian Murray (footballer) (born 1981), Scottish football player and player-manager
Ian Murray (Canadian politician) (born 1951), Canadian Member of Parliament
Ian Murray (Scottish politician) (born 1976), MP for Edinburgh South
Ian Murray (strongman), winner of Scotland's Strongest Man in 1987 (see Strength athletics in the United Kingdom and Ireland).

See also 
Ian Murray Mackerras (1898–1980), Australian zoologist
Iain Murray (disambiguation)